Hermelindo Soto (born October 28, 1949) is a Mexican sprint canoer who competed in the early to mid-1970s. At the 1972 Summer Olympics in Munich, he was eliminated in the repechages of both the K-1 1000 m and K-4 1000 m events. Four years later in Montreal, Soto was eliminated in the semifinals of the K-2 500 m event and the repechages of the K-2 1000 m event.

References

1949 births
Canoeists at the 1972 Summer Olympics
Canoeists at the 1976 Summer Olympics
Living people
Mexican male canoeists
Olympic canoeists of Mexico